Viktor Pavlovich Potapov (7 January 1934 – 23 June 2021) was an officer of the Soviet military who held a number of posts in naval aviation, serving as the last head of Soviet Naval Aviation, and the first head of Russian Naval Aviation, reaching the rank of .

Born in 1934, Potapov became interested in aviation at an early age. He continued to develop his skills on the latest military aircraft entering service, and rose through the ranks and positions. 

After studies at the Military Academy of the General Staff of the Armed Forces, he was appointed to command the Northern Fleet's Naval Aviation. In 1986, he was appointed first deputy commander, and in 1988 commander of Soviet Naval Aviation. After the dissolution of the Soviet Union, he continued as the first commander of the successor force, Russian Naval Aviation, until his retirement in 1994. He went on to work with a company manufacturing aviation radio-electronic systems, and died in 2021, having received numerous awards and honours over his career.

Family and early life
Later that year his family moved to Tashkent, settling near an aircraft factory. Potapov grew up around aircraft, and reading the exploits of Soviet pilots such as Valery Chkalov, Mikhail Gromov and Konstantin Kokkinaki. In 1949, while still at school, Potapov entered the Tashkent flying club. He made his first independent flight the following year, in a Polikarpov Po-2, and remained at the flying club until his graduation from high school.

With his previous experience he was allowed to skip the second year of studies, and quickly mastered the Yakovlev Yak-18 and Tupolev Tu-2 propeller-driven aircraft, as well as the Ilyushin Il-28 jet torpedo bomber. He became proficient on the Tupolev Tu-16 torpedo bomber in 1957, at the time the most advanced of its kind, before entering the aviation faculty of the Leningrad Naval Academy in 1959. He graduated with a gold medal in 1962, and returned to the Black Sea Fleet Air Force, taking charge of a squadron in naval missile-armed aviation regiment.

Commands
The regiment was in the process of formation, equipped with Tupolev Tu-95RTs maritime reconnaissance aircraft. By late 1967, the regiment was fully operational, and in November that year, Potapov was instructed to form a new regiment at Fedotovo, operating the Ilyushin Il-38. These were maritime patrol aircraft equipped for anti-submarine warfare. Potapov succeeded in this task, and was awarded the Order of the Red Star, while the regiment, the 24th Anti-Submarine Regiment was rated excellent in 1969.

Over his flying career, he participated in missions in the Central and South Atlantic using airfields in Cuba, Angola and Guinea. Between 1976 and 1978, he was deputy commander of the Northern Fleet Air Force. 
He took part in the first operation on the mass use of aviation of the Northern Fleet Air Force for operational and strategic purposes, involving 104 aircraft flying in the North Atlantic. He enrolled in the Military Academy of the General Staff of the Armed Forces in 1978, again graduating with a gold medal in 1980 and being appointed commander of the Northern Fleet Air Force. In 1986 he was appointed first deputy commander, and in 1988 commander of Soviet Naval Aviation. He held the post during the dissolution of the Soviet Union in 1991, and continued as the first commander of the successor force, Russian Naval Aviation, until his retirement in 1994.

Awards and later life
In retirement, Potapov was director of the Moscow branch of the holding company "Leninets", which manufactured aviation radio-electronic systems. Over his career, he had received the Order of the Red Banner, the Order of the Red Star, and the Order "For Service to the Homeland in the Armed Forces of the USSR", Second and Third Classes. In 1975, he received the title of Honoured Military Pilot of the USSR. On 31 January 2017, he was honoured with the naming of a refurbished Il-38N "Viktor Potapov". Potapov, who had overseen the introduction of the first Il-38s fifty years earlier, attended the event, held in Zhukovsky. Over his career, he had mastered the operation of eight types of aircraft. 

Potapov died in Moscow on 23 June 2021 at the age of 87.

References

1934 births
2021 deaths
People from Mokshansky District
Soviet colonel generals
Recipients of the Order of the Red Banner
Recipients of the Order of the Red Star
Recipients of the Order "For Service to the Homeland in the Armed Forces of the USSR", 2nd class
Recipients of the Order "For Service to the Homeland in the Armed Forces of the USSR", 3rd class
Russian aviators
Soviet aviators
N. G. Kuznetsov Naval Academy alumni
Military Academy of the General Staff of the Armed Forces of the Soviet Union alumni